Gevitz is a surname. Notable people with the surname include:

 Luna Gevitz (born 1994), Danish footballer
 Norman Gevitz, American medical historian